Metropol İstanbul is a mixed-use skyscraper in the Ataşehir district in Istanbul, Turkey. The tower is the tallest building in Istanbul and the 14th tallest in Europe.

History 
Metropol Istanbul is a mixed project consisting of residences, office space, shopping mall and a hotel. The project was proposed in 2011 and constructed in the years following, with completion in 2017. It is one of the largest shopping centers in Turkey. The complex also contains a 16 screen cinema.

The first phase of the building complex was opened in 2017 while the shopping mall portion opened in 2019. The complex consists of three towers, a residence (150 m), a home office (150 m) and a main tower (301 m).

Design 
The DasDas Performing Arts Center is located in the Metropol Istanbul complex. The living and office blocks of the complex have an area of more than 800 thousand m². The towers were designed by Architectural Firm RMJM while the shopping mall was designed by Roy Higgs International. The complex cost $800 million to construct and is now the tallest building in Istanbul and Turkey.

References

Skyscrapers in Istanbul
Ataşehir